The 2007 San Diego State Aztecs football team represented San Diego State University in the 2007 NCAA Division I FBS college football season. The Aztecs, led by head coach Chuck Long, played their home games at the Qualcomm Stadium. They finished with a record of 4–8 (3–5 MWC).

Schedule

References

San Diego State
San Diego State Aztecs football seasons
San Diego State Aztecs football